Copelatus bilunatus is a species of diving beetle. It is part of the genus Copelatus in the subfamily Copelatinae of the family Dytiscidae. It was described by Félix Guignot in 1955.

References

bilunatus
Beetles described in 1955